Oxygene may refer to:

 Oxygene (programming language)
 Oxygène, an album by Jean Michel Jarre, released in 1976
 Oxygène: New Master Recording, a new version of Jean Michel Jarre's 1976 album, released in 2007
 Oxygène 7–13, an album by Jean Michel Jarre, released in 1997
 Oxygène 3, an album by Jean Michel Jarre, released in 2016
 Oxygène, a song by C418 from Minecraft - Volume Alpha
 Oxygen (2021 film), a French film

See also
 Oxygen (disambiguation)